Ajith Premakumara Millagaha Gedara (born 12 October 1991) is a sprinter from Sri Lanka who specialises in the 400 m distance. He won silver medals in the 4 × 400 m relay at the 2016 South Asian Games and 2017 Asian Championships; his team placed fourth at the 2018 Asian Games.

References

Sri Lankan male sprinters
1991 births
Living people
Athletes (track and field) at the 2018 Asian Games
South Asian Games silver medalists for Sri Lanka
Asian Games competitors for Sri Lanka
South Asian Games medalists in athletics